The Men's marathon T11 was a marathon event in athletics at the 2000 Summer Paralympics in Sydney, for totally blind athletes. Defending champion Harumi Yanagawa of Japan took part, as did 1992 gold medallist Carlo Durante of Italy, and 1988 gold medallist Joerund Gaasemyr or Norway, holder of the Paralympic record in 2:45:48. There were thirteen starters, from nine countries; twelve of them reached the finish line. Portugal's Carlos Amaral Ferreira took gold, setting a new world record in 2:38:27, and finishing over nine minutes ahead of silver medallist Robert Matthews.

Results

See also
 Marathon at the Paralympics

References 

Men's marathon T11
2000 marathons
Marathons at the Paralympics
Men's marathons